The 2022 Canada Cricket World Cup Challenge League A was played in Canada in July and August 2022. It was the second round of matches in Group A of the 2019–2022 ICC Cricket World Cup Challenge League, a cricket tournament which forms part of the qualification pathway to the 2023 Cricket World Cup. All of the matches  have List A status, and were played at the Maple Leaf North-West Ground in King City, Ontario. Originally, the tournament was scheduled to take place in August 2021, but was postponed by a year due to the COVID-19 pandemic.

Squads

Rival Samson was named as traveling reserve in Vanuatu's squad. Abdullah Mahmood and Adam Leigh were named as travelling reserve in Denmark's squad, due to visa delays for Taranjit Bharaj and Jino Jojo.

Fixtures

Notes

References

External links
 Series home at ESPN Cricinfo

International cricket competitions in Canada
International cricket competitions in 2022
Canada Cricket World Cup Challenge League A
Sport in King, Ontario
Canada Cricket World Cup Challenge League A
Canada Cricket World Cup Challenge League A